A Twisted Christmas is the sixth and final studio album by American heavy metal group Twisted Sister, with the band releasing it on October 17, 2006. The album features classic Christmas songs performed in metal versions, often featuring lyrical changes.

Holiday carol "Oh Come All Ye Faithful", which heavily inspired the band's popular song "We're Not Gonna Take It", is recorded in a style exactly like the Twisted Sister hit. The group's take on the carol has become one of their most well-known songs since their 1980s heyday, with Twisted Sister creating a comedic music video involving the band members crashing a holiday celebration in a bickering couple's home.

Premise and inspiration
Although not properly a concept album, the album begins with a version of "Have Yourself a Merry Little Christmas" done in the style of traditional pop music that's interrupted by a bit of banter by the group's members. Things then segue into the band's standard heavy metal style, though incorporating festive elements such as the tolling sounds of bells. Track "Heavy Metal Christmas (The Twelve Days of Christmas)", including a section known as "We Wish You a Twisted Christmas", closes out the album in a burst of clapping and cheers.

"Oh Come All Ye Faithful" closely follows what the band did with their hit "We're Not Gonna Take It". Significant elements of their popular song had taken inspiration from the carol. The song was performed on The Tonight Show with Jay Leno on December 13, 2006.

Parts of the guitar riff to "White Christmas" seem to be based on "I Wanna Rock", another Twisted Sister song. Parts of the guitar riff on "Silver Bells" is based on "Problem Child" by AC/DC. Some of the guitar riffs on "Let It Snow" are based on Black Sabbath's "Children of the Grave," although the intro sounds rather similar to "Rock and Roll Saviors" which was a song the band had during their club days. Some of the guitar riffs from "Deck the Halls" are based on "The Boys Are Back in Town" by Thin Lizzy. Also, the guitar riffs on the song "I Saw Mommy Kissing Santa Claus" are based on "You've Got Another Thing Comin'" by Judas Priest.

Metal star Ozzy Osbourne's influence on the group and its music is name-checked in closing number "Heavy Metal Christmas (The Twelve Days of Christmas)": with the promised gifts being "twelve silver crosses, eleven black mascaras, ten pairs of platforms, nine tattered t-shirts, eight pentagrams, seven leather jackets, six cans of hairspray, five skull-head rings, four quarts of Jack, three studded belts, two pairs of spandex pants, and a tattoo of Ozzy".

Recording and release
The album was recorded from June to August 2006. The band produced the release themselves.

Two music videos were made for "Oh Come All Ye Faithful". The first one follows the same style of the band's landmark videos "We're Not Gonna Take It" and "I Wanna Rock", as a married couple celebrate Christmas when the wife discovers that her husband's gift to her is a CD copy of A Twisted Christmas. She then starts to rant about the present until Snider and the band appear behind her. Her lines then are a nod to the video of "We're Not Gonna Take It" where a father scolds his son with the exact same words.

The second video version used the radio edit of the track. It is a short animated feature with the band taking over Santa's workshop and using his sleigh to drop off Twisted Sister merchandise and cans of hairspray to children.

The music video for "Silver Bells" is the sequel to the first "Oh Come All Ye Faithful" video, as the couple are paid a visit by numerous guests while the band performs live on television. The couple's new baby's head is replaced by the face of various band members singing.
 
Twisted Sister also filmed a studio performance of "Heavy Metal Christmas" for GameTap. Unusually, this video featured frontman Snider without his makeup.

Reception

Music critic James C. Monger praised the release for the publication AllMusic. Monger remarked that the band's members "filter the beloved Christmas carol" tradition "through the same makeup-smeared sieve" that brought them earlier success. Arguing that Christmas albums "need to either be pretty good, horrifically terrible, or completely original to cause even the jolliest head to turn", he wrote that Twisted Christmas "manages to achieve all three" and constitutes a "collection of yuletide classics".

Track listing

Personnel

Twisted Sister
Dee Snider – lead vocals
Jay Jay French – guitars, backing vocals
Eddie "Fingers" Ojeda – guitars, backing vocals
Mark "The Animal" Mendoza – bass, backing vocals
A. J. Pero – drums, backing vocals

Additional musicians
Lita Ford – co-lead vocals on "I'll Be Home for Christmas"
Doro Pesch – backing vocals on "White Christmas"

Production
Jay Jay French – executive producer
Mark "The Animal" Mendoza – producer, mixing, mastering
Denny McNerney – engineer, mixing, mastering
George Marshall – assistant engineer
David Wong;– assistant engineer

See also
 2006 in music
 Holiday music
 Twisted Sister discography

References

2006 Christmas albums
Christmas albums by American artists
Covers albums
Heavy metal Christmas albums
Twisted Sister albums
Razor & Tie albums